Nørrebro station is an interchange station between the S-train Ring Line and the Copenhagen Metro City Circle Line in the Outer Nørrebro district of Copenhagen, Denmark. It is situated at the junction of Nørrebrogade, Folmer Bendtsens Plads, Frederikssundsvej and Nordre Fasanvej. The functionalist station building from 1940 was listed on the Danish registry of protected buildings and places in 1992.

History
The first station at the site was opened on 1 July 1886. The current station opened on  15 May 1930. The metro station was opened on 29 September 2019 together with 16 other stations on the line.

Design
The functionalist station building from 1940 was designed by Knud Tanggaard Seest. The building was listed on the Danish registry of protected buildings and places in 1992.

See also
 List of railway stations in Denmark

References

External links

S-train (Copenhagen) stations
Listed buildings and structures in Nørrebro
City Circle Line (Copenhagen Metro) stations
Railway stations opened in 1930
1930 establishments in Denmark
Railway stations opened in 2019
2019 establishments in Denmark
Knud Tanggaard Seest railway stations
Railway stations in Denmark opened in the 21st century